The 1979 Wake Forest Demon Deacons football team was an American football team that represented Wake Forest University during the 1979 NCAA Division I-A football season. In its second season under head coach John Mackovic, the team compiled an 8–4 record, finished in fourth place in the Atlantic Coast Conference, and lost to LSU in the 1979 Tangerine Bowl.

Schedule

Roster

Team leaders

References

Wake Forest
Wake Forest Demon Deacons football seasons
Wake Forest Demon Deacons football